Batalha (Portuguese for battle) may refer to:

Portugal
Batalha, Portugal, a municipality
Batalha Monastery (officially Mosteiro Santa Maria da Vitória), monastery in Batalha, Portugal
Batalha Square, a historical public square in the city of Porto
Brazil
Batalha, Alagoas, municipality in Alagoas, Brazil (15,000 inhabitants)
Batalha, Piauí, municipality in Piauí, Brazil
Batalha River, river in São Paulo

People
José Lodi Batalha, Brazilian footballer
Martha Batalha, Brazilian journalist
Rui Batalha, Portuguese footballer

Portuguese-language surnames